Saad bin Faisal Al Saud (1942 – April 2017) was a member of the Saudi royal family and a businessman.

Early life and education
Saad bin Faisal was born in 1942 and was the son of King Faisal and Haya bint Turki bin Abdulaziz Al Turki. His mother was a member of the Al Jiluwi clan. Prince Saad's full siblings were Prince Khalid and Princess Noura (died March 2022). 

Prince Saad was a graduate of the Hun School of Princeton like his brothers. Then he attended Princeton University, but left it soon. He obtained a law degree from the University of Cambridge.

Career
Prince Saad was the deputy governor at Petromin from 1971 to 1973. He also worked at the Ministry of Petroleum. Following his retirement from government he began to involve in business. He headed the King Faisal Foundation. From 1999 to 2017 he was a member of Effat University board of founders and board of trustees. From 2018 his daughter, Sara, joined both boards as a member.

He died in April 2017 and was buried in Mecca following the funeral prayers at the Grand Mosque on 11 April.

Ancestry

References

External links

Saad
Saad
1942 births
2017 deaths
Alumni of the University of Cambridge
Saad
Hun School of Princeton alumni
Saad